Haffner Glacier is a small glacier discharging into Berg Bay along the north coast of Victoria Land, Antarctica. It was first charted by the British Antarctic Expedition, 1898–1900, under Carsten. E. Borchgrevink, who named it for Colonel Haffner, Director of the Government Survey of Norway. This glacier lies situated on the Pennell Coast, a portion of Antarctica lying between Cape Williams and Cape Adare.

See also
 List of glaciers in the Antarctic
 Glaciology

References

Glaciers of Pennell Coast